The Clean Cooking Alliance, formerly the Global Alliance for Clean Cookstoves, is a non-profit organization operating with the support of the United Nations Foundation to promote clean cooking technologies in lower and middle-income countries.  According to the World Health Organization, 4.3 million people a year die from health problems attributable to household air pollution from the use of polluting open fires and inefficient fuels for cooking. The Alliance was announced in 2010 by then-U.S. Secretary of State Hillary Rodham Clinton.
Dymphna previously worked as CEO for the Clinton Climate Initiative organization.

They also provide grants for research and initiatives that support the aims of the Alliance, advocate for international standards for stove manufacturers, and coordinate research and knowledge of the issues surrounding the use of clean cookstoves.

Endorsements 
A number of celebrities and musical artists have used their platforms to shed light on an issue that affects 3 billion people worldwide, including American actor Julia Roberts, world-renowned chef Jose Andres, Second Lady of the Republic of Ghana Samira Bawumia, Indian chef Sanjeev Kapoor, China's Zhao Wei, and Ghana's Rocky Dawuni.

References

External links 
Ghana News Agency: Govt distributed LPG cylinders and cook stoves
Ghana Soccer Net: Ex-Ghana captain Stephen Appiah made ambassador for Global Alliance for Clean Cookstoves
Gov.UK: Climate change: DFID wins award for clean cooking initiative
The Guardian: Cookstove designs are failing the poorest communities
International Business Times: Green Development: Advocates Say There's One Simple Solution To Health And Energy Woes In Developing Countries: The Clean Cookstove
PBS Newshour: Designing cleaner stoves for home cooks in the developing world
Sci Dev Net: Urgent action needed for clean cooking, heating fuels
Swedish Energy Agency: The Swedish Energy Agency supports Improved Cookstoves in Africa
United Nations Foundation: Strengthening the Safety of Women Refugees through Cleaner Cookstoves
The White House: Protecting Public Health and the Environment
University of Washington Clean Cookstoves Research

Occupational safety and health
Poverty-related organizations